is the first TV anime adaptation of Monkey Punch's manga series of the same name.

Production

The series was produced by Yomiuri Telecasting Corporation and Tokyo Movie, with character designs by Yasuo Ōtsuka, it was directed originally by Masaaki Ōsumi and later by Hayao Miyazaki and Isao Takahata under the name "A Productions". It aired on Yomiuri Telecasting Corporation in two seasons from October 24, 1971 to March 26, 1972, the first 11 episodes being of the first season and the latter 12 of the second.

The series centers on the adventures of Arsène Lupin III, the grandson of Arsène Lupin, the gentleman thief of Maurice Leblanc's series of novels. He is joined by Daisuke Jigen, Lupin's closest ally; Fujiko Mine, the femme fatale and Lupin's love interest who works against Lupin more often than with him; and Goemon Ishikawa XIII, a master swordsman and a descendant of Ishikawa Goemon, the legendary Japanese bandit. Lupin is often chased by Inspector Zenigata of the Tokyo Metropolitan Police, a descendant of Zenigata Heiji. A rather cynical detective, Zenigata has made it his life's mission to chase Lupin across the globe in hopes of arresting him.

When Miyazaki and Takahata took over directing duties from Ōsumi, they changed the tone of the series, adding more humor and making Lupin more family friendly, setting the blueprint for all subsequent Lupin animations (with the exception of The Mystery of Mamo and the 2012 TV series). A pilot film, also directed by Ōsumi, was made in 1969 prior to this anime, footage from the pilot is used in the opening sequences. Several of the early episodes take their plotlines from chapters of the original manga, namely episodes 2 and 4-6. The show has three opening theme songs and one ending song.

The first Lupin III TV series was released in Japan in a DVD box set by VAP on October 14, 2001, and on five separate individual discs on April 3, 2002. It was included in the Lupin the Box - TV & the movie - box set that was released on March 14, 2007, which also contained the second and third TV series and the first three theatrical films, and was released in a Blu-ray box set on December 12, 2008. On July 12, 2011, Discotek announced they licensed the entire TV series for a North American DVD release on June 26, 2012. The episodes are subtitled, several have optional English commentary by Lupin fans, and the release also includes extensive liner notes on each episode and both versions of the 1969 pilot film.

Pilot film

Episodes

See also

 Lupin III
 List of Lupin III Part II episodes
 List of Lupin III Part III episodes
 List of Lupin III: The Woman Called Fujiko Mine episodes
 List of Lupin III Part IV episodes
 List of Lupin III Part V episodes
 List of Lupin III television specials

References

External links
 Official website 
 
 Lupin III First TV Series on The Lupin III Encyclopedia
 

Lupin the Third Part I
Lupin the Third Part I

es:Anexo:Episodios de Lupin III#Serie 1 (1971)
ja:ルパン三世 (TV第1シリーズ)
zh:鲁邦三世 (TV第1期)